The  superyacht Luna B was launched by Oceanco at their yard in Alblasserdam. The yacht's exterior design was done by the yard itself and Alberto Pinto was responsible for the interior design. She is owned by American/Canadian billionaire Robert Friedland.

History 
Luna B was first launched in 2005, and was named Dilbar upon delivery to her owner Alisher Usmanov. She was renamed Ona in 2008 when Usmanov took delivery of a new  yacht built by Lürssen which he also named Dilbar.

William Kallop bought Ona in 2010 and renamed her Natita after his mother-in-law. In 2014, he took on a $32 million loan from Goldman Sachs with Natita and his other yacht, the  Bad Girl, as collateral. Kallop stopped paying back the loan in 2016 with $28 million still left. Goldman Sachs filed a lawsuit at a federal court in Miami to have both yachts seized. US Marshals seized both vessels in august 2017 at a West Palm Beach marina. Goldman Sachs listed Natita for sale with a $39,9 million asking price. In October 2017 it was announced they had sold the yacht for $27,5 million.

The new owner was revealed to be Robert Friedland, who put Luna B up for sale once more in 2022 with a $47,5 million asking price.

Design 
The hull is built out of steel while the superstructure is made out of aluminium with teak laid decks. The yacht is classed by Lloyd's Register and flagged in the Cayman Islands.

Performance 
Propulsion is supplied by twin 3,015hp Deutz AG (SBV 12M 628) diesel engines.

Amenities 
Zero speed stabilizers, gym, swimming pool, movie theatre, tender garage, swimming platform, air conditioning, beach club, spa room. There is also a helicopter landing pad on the top deck.

Tenders 
 One  Royal Denship open sports tender
 One  Royal Denship limo tender
 One  Nautica Jet RIB

Recreational toys 
2x Yamaha FX1200 jet-skis, seabobs, water skis, wakesurf board, Paddleboard and a water slide.

See also 
 List of motor yachts by length
 List of yachts built by Oceanco

References 

2005 ships
Motor yachts
Ships built in the Netherlands